Different Days is a studio album by American duo L'Altra. It was released on Hefty Records on January 25, 2005.

Critical reception

At Metacritic, which assigns a weighted average score out of 100 to reviews from mainstream critics, the album received an average score of 71, based on 14 reviews, indicating "generally favorable reviews".

Rob Theakston of AllMusic gave the album 4 stars out of 5, calling it "an album that skillfully balances and blurs the line between electronic music and a nostalgic longing for a whispy dream pop revival." He added, "The themes of isolation, solitude and general soul-crushing existence makes it their most blatantly honest work and helps further reinforce the notion that this is their most fully realized and beautiful release to date." Sam Url of Pitchfork gave the album a 7.6 out of 10, saying, "Different Days is notable for its consistency; a collection of primarily lovelorn ballads, each song flickers with detail while retaining many common characteristics."

Track listing

Personnel
Credits adapted from liner notes.

L'Altra
 Joseph Costa – vocals, choir, production, acoustic guitar, electric guitar, steel guitar, bass guitar, Wurlitzer piano, handclaps, programming
 Lindsay Anderson – vocals, choir, production, electric guitar, bass guitar, piano, organ, Wurlitzer piano, Rhodes piano, Moog synthesizer, melodica, flute

Additional personnel
 Joshua Eustis – music, production, choir, acoustic guitar, electric guitar, slide guitar, bass guitar, Wurlitzer piano, mellotron, glockenspiel, wooden flute, handclaps, tambourine, shaker, programming, recording, additional piano recording, mixing
 Frederick Lonberg-Holm – choir, cello, trumpet
 Brian Harding – clarinet, bass clarinet
 Nate Walcott – trumpet, flugelhorn
 Marc Hellner – choir, guitar, programming
 Eben English – bass guitar, drums, tambourine, shaker
 Charles Cooper – handclaps, programming
 Sana Kinaya – handclaps
 Kevin Duneman – drums
 Jason Ward – additional drum recording
 Roger Seibel – mastering
 Sockho – design
 Jesse Chehak – photography

References

External links
 

2005 albums
L'Altra albums
Hefty Records albums